The Spanish nationality legal framework refers to all the laws, provisions, regulations, and resolutions in Spain concerning nationality.

Article 11 of the First Title of the Spanish Constitution refers to Spanish nationality and establishes that a separate law is to regulate how it is acquired and lost. Lacking an overarching unifying legal body, the current regulation about nationality in Spain is thus contained in 17–28th articles of the Civil Code, 63–68th articles of the Civil Registry Law, 220–237th articles of the Civil Registry Regulations and in a number of instructions and resolutions from the Directorate General for Registers and Notaries.

Spanish citizenship by origin is defined in the Civil Code on the principle of jus sanguinis (with some limited jus soli provisions) and it can be voluntarily renounced but not forcefully removed. The most common mode of acquisition of derivative citizenship is legal and continuous residence in the country. The Spanish legal framework is considered to be one of the most restrictive in Europe in terms of citizenship acquisition. A preferential treatment in this regard is granted to former colonies, whose citizens also enjoy the privilege of not needing to renounce their original citizenship to acquire the Spanish one.

History
Traditionally, considerations about the Spanish nationality had been (successively) regulated by constitutional articles: the 5th article of the 1812 Cádiz Constitution, 1st article of the 1837 Constitution, 1st Article of the 1845 Constitution, 2nd article of the unpromulgated 1856 Constitution, 1st article of the 1869 Constitution and 1st article of the 1876 Constitution.

The original text of the 1889 Civil Code was partially or wholly amended by the 23th and 24th articles of the 1931 Constitution (which opened a way for exploring double citizenship agreements with Ibero–American countries), and the 1954, 1975, 1982, 1990, and 2002 laws.
The current Constitution of 1978  is the first that does not define Spanish nationality. Rather, article 11 establishes that Spanish nationality is acquired, preserved and lost in accordance with the provisions of the law. It is also the first constitution that emphasises that a español de origen ("Spaniard by origin") cannot be deprived of their nationality. On 13 July 1982, and in accordance to what had been established in the constitution, the first law regarding nationality was approved, which was in fact an amendment to the Spanish Civil Code in effect. This law has been reformed on 17 December 1990, 23 December 1993, 2 November 1995, and most recently 2 October 2002.

Acquisition of Spanish citizenship
Title One of Book One of the Spanish Civil Code lays out the details of Spanish nationality.

By origin
Spanish legislation regarding nationality establishes two types of nationality: "Spanish nationality by origin" (nacionalidad española de origen)—that is, a "natural-born Spaniard"—and the "Spanish nationality not by origin" (nacionalidad española no de origen).

According to article 17 of the Spanish Civil Code, the following are Spaniards by birth right are:
 those individuals born of a Spanish parent;
 those individuals born in Spain of foreign parents if at least one of the parents was also born in Spain, with the exception of children of foreign diplomatic or consular officers accredited in Spain;
 those individuals born in Spain of foreign parents if neither of them has a nationality, or if the legislation of either parent's home country does not grant the child any nationality;
 those individuals born in Spain of undetermined filiation; those individuals whose first known territory of residence is Spain, are considered born in Spain.

Foreign minors under the age of 18 acquire Spanish nationality by origin upon being adopted by a Spanish national. An adoptee over the age of 18 can apply for Spanish nationality by origin up to two years after the adoption.

Since the 1889 Civil Code came into effect, there have been various regulations requiring registration of births of Spaniards abroad, and limiting citizenship by descent to a specified number of generations.  These rules have changed over time; the rules in force at the time of birth usually apply.

Under Article 24.1, persons born outside Spain, other than in specified Spanish-speaking countries, to a Spanish citizen born in Spain will lose Spanish nationality if they exclusively use a foreign nationality acquired before adulthood. That loss can be avoided by registering the desire to preserve Spanish nationality in the civil registry at a Spanish consulate.

Until a 9 January 2003 change in the law, Spanish citizens born in an Ibero-American country or specific former Spanish territories to a Spanish citizen parent, also born outside of Spain, and who held that other country's citizenship, preserved Spanish citizenship with no retention declaration required. After that date, second generation born abroad Spaniards from the Iberosphere who were not already 18 or in legal majority (adulthood) by that date, and who held the other country's citizenship, are required to declare their intention to retain Spanish nationality to Spanish authorities within three years of majority (until age 21).

The range of Ibero-American countries in which Spanish jus sanguinis will apply to a person of Spanish descent has also changed over time as Spain has signed agreements and treaties with countries.

All other people who acquire Spanish nationality are "Spaniards not by origin".

By option
Article 20 of the Spanish Civil Code, established that the following individuals have the right to apply (lit. "to opt") for Spanish nationality:
 those individuals that were under the tutelage of a Spanish citizen,
 those individuals whose father or mother had been originally Spanish and born in Spain (i.e. those individuals who were born after their parent(s) had lost  Spanish nationality, or those born with another nationality before 1982 to a Spanish mother).
 those individuals mentioned in the second bullet-point in article 17, and adopted foreigners of 18 years of age or more.

Spanish nationality by option must be claimed within two years after their 18th birthday or after their "emancipation", regardless of age, except for those individuals whose father or mother had been originally Spanish and born in Spain, for which there is no age limit. Spanish nationality by option does not confer "nationality by origin" unless otherwise specified (i.e. those mentioned in article 17, and those who obtained it through the Law of Historical Memory).

Naturalization

Spanish nationality can be acquired by naturalization, which is only granted at the discretion of the government through a Royal Decree, and under exceptional circumstances, for example to notable individuals.

Also, any individual can request Spanish nationality after a period of continuous legal residence in Spain, as long as he or she is 18 years or older, or through a legal representative if he or she is younger.
Under Article 22, to apply for nationality through residence it is necessary for the individual to have legally resided in Spain for:
 ten years, or
 five years if the individual is a refugee, or
 two years if the individual is a natural-born citizen of a country of Ibero-America (including individuals with Puerto Rican citizenship), Portugal, Andorra, the Philippines, Equatorial Guinea, or if the individual can prove they are a Sephardi Jew with a connection to Spain; or
 one year for individuals:
 born in Spanish territory, or
 who did not exercise their right to nationality by option within the established period of time, or
 who have been under the legal tutelage or protection of a Spanish citizen or institution for two consecutive years,
 who have been married for one year to a Spanish national and are not separated legally or de facto, or
 are widow(er)s of a Spanish national if at the time of death they were not legally or de facto separated, or
 who were born outside of Spain, if one of their parents or grandparents was originally Spanish (i.e. Spanish by origin).

In addition to meeting the residence requirement, applicants must pass the DELE and possess at least a level A2 certificate unless the applicant is a citizen of a country where Spanish is an official language, as well as pass a cultural and historical knowledge exam called the CCSE (Conocimientos Constitucionales y Socioculturales de España).

Sephardi Jews

In 2015 the Government of Spain passed Law 12/2015 of 24 June, whereby the descendants of Sephardi Jews of Spanish origin could obtain Spanish nationality by naturalisation, without the residency requirement as explained above. The law required applicants to apply for citizenship within three years from 1 October 2015, provide evidence of their Sephardi origin, demonstrate a special connection with Spain, and pass examinations on the Spanish language and Spanish culture and institutions. The law provided for a possible one-year extension of the deadline to 1 October 2019; it was indeed extended in March 2018. The deadline for completing the requirements was extended until September 2021 due to delays due to the Covid-19 pandemic, but only for those who had made a preliminary application by 1 October 2019. This path to citizenship is in restitution for the 1492 expulsion of the Jews from Spain.

The Law establishes the right to Spanish nationality of Sephardi Jews with a connection to Spain. An Instruction of 29 September 2015 removes a provision whereby those acquiring Spanish nationality by law 12/2015 must renounce any other nationality held. Most applicants must have passed a test of Spanish language proficiency (DELE) and a test of knowledge of Spanish culture and institutions (CCSE), but those who were under 18, or handicapped, were exempted. A Resolution in May 2017 also exempted those aged over 70.

By July 2017 the government of Spain had registered about 4,300 applicants who had begun the process, and about 1,000 had signed before a notary public and filed their documents officially. A hundred, from various countries, had been granted citizenship, with another 400 expected within weeks. The Spanish government was then taking 8–10 months to decide on each case. After 2017, it would take 1–2 years to resolve a complete application. By March 2018 over 6,200 people had been granted Spanish citizenship under this law. And by the end of 2019, a total of about 132,000 applications were received, 67,000 of them in the month before the 30 September 2019 deadline.

Loss and recovery of Spanish nationality
Spanish nationality can be lost under the following circumstances:
 Those individuals of 18 years of age or more whose residence is not Spain and who acquire voluntarily another nationality, or who use exclusively another nationality which was conferred to them prior to their age of emancipation lose Spanish nationality. In this case, loss of nationality occurs three years after the acquisition of the foreign nationality or emancipation only if the individual does not declare their will to retain Spanish nationality. The exception to this are those Spaniards by origin who acquire the nationality of an Iberoamerican country, Andorra, Philippines, Equatorial Guinea or Portugal;
 Those Spanish nationals that expressly renounce Spanish nationality if they also possess another nationality and reside outside Spain will lose Spanish nationality;
 Those minors born outside Spain that have acquired Spanish citizenship being children of Spanish nationals that were also born outside Spain, and if the laws of the country in which they live grant them another nationality, will lose Spanish nationality if they do not declare their will to retain it within three years after their 18th birthday or the date of their emancipation.

The Civil Code regulations on loss of citizenship, and the reasons for it—including lack of registration with Spanish consular authorities overseas—and the practical application of those regulations, has varied over time.

Spanish nationality is not lost as described above if Spain is at war.

In addition, Spaniards "not by origin", will lose their nationality if:
 they use exclusively for a period of three years their previous nationality—with the exception of the nationality of those countries with which Spain has signed an agreement of dual nationality;
 they participate voluntarily in the army of a foreign country, or serve in public office in a foreign government, against the specific prohibition of the Spanish Government;
 they had lied or committed fraud when they applied for Spanish nationality.

People who lose Spanish nationality can recover it if they become legal residents in Spain. Emigrants and their children are not required to return to Spain to recover their Spanish nationality. (Since the nationality law automatically grants Spanish nationality to people born of a Spanish parent, a person born outside Spain to a parent of Spanish birth and nationality who uses the citizenship of the other country exclusively since birth is said to "recover" their Spanish nationality should they apply for it).

Descendants of political exiles

2007 Law of Historical Memory

In 2007, the Congress of Deputies, under the government of prime minister José Luis Rodríguez Zapatero, approved the Law of Historical Memory with the aim of recognising the rights of those who suffered persecution or violence during the Spanish Civil War (1936-1939), and the dictatorial regime that followed (1939-1975). In recognition of the "injustice produced by the exile" of thousands of Spaniards, the law allowed their descendants to obtain Spanish nationality by origin, specifically for:
 those individuals born of a parent that was Spanish by origin, regardless of the place of birth of the parent, whatever the age of the applicant. (The Spanish Civil code currently grants Spanish nationality "by origin" only to those individuals born of a person that held Spanish nationality at the time of birth, and  Spanish nationality "not by origin" to those individuals born of former Spanish nationals that were born in Spain or that acquired Spanish nationality after the birth of the child but before the child turned 18. In the latter case, the child has until his 20th birthday to request citizenship); and
 those individuals whose grandfather or grandmother had been exiled because of the Spanish Civil War, and had lost his or her Spanish nationality. In this case the applicant must have proven that the grandparent had left Spain as a refugee or that the grandparent left Spain between 18 July 1936 and 31 December 1955.

The law also granted Spanish nationality by origin to those foreign individual members of the International Brigades who had defended the Second Spanish Republic in the Spanish Civil War. (In 1996, they were granted Spanish nationality "not by origin", which implied that they had to renounce their previous nationality—Spanish nationals "by origin" cannot be deprived of their nationality, and therefore,  these individuals can also retain their original nationality).

By virtue of this law, if an individual, whose father or mother had been originally Spanish and born in Spain, and who had previously acquired Spanish nationality "not by origin" by option (art. 20) could request his or her nationality be changed to nationality "by origin", if he or she chose to do so.

Spanish nationality could be acquired by the Law of Historical memory from on 27 December 2008 until 26 December 2011; 446,277 people had applied by 30 November 2011. Around 95% were Latin American, half of them from Cuba and Argentina. To the surprise of government officials, 92.5% of all applications were made by sons or daughters of Spaniards by origin regardless of their place of birth, and only 6.1% by grandchildren of refugees.

Many applications under the law came from Cuba, which also offered those Cubans an ability to leave the island, and to also live and work in EU countries other than Spain.

2022 Democratic Memory Law
The Democratic Memory Law, which passed the upper house of parliament on 5 October 2022, and came into effect on 21 October 2022, offered Spanish citizenship to the children of Spanish exiles who had fled from the regime. The 2007 Historical Memory Law had excluded children of exiles who had changed or renounced their Spanish citizenship; the new law entitled any descendant of Spanish immigrants born before 1985 – the year Spain changed its nationality law – to citizenship. This now included the grandchildren of people exiled under the Franco dictatorship, and the descendants of women who had lost their citizenship on marrying non-Spaniards. It is estimated that 700,000 people could be eligible for citizenship under the new "grandchildren law".

Dual citizenship
Dual citizenship is permitted for all Spaniards by origin, as long as they declare their will to retain Spanish nationality within three years of the acquisition of another nationality. This requirement is waived for the acquisition of the nationality of a Latin American country, Andorra, the Philippines, Equatorial Guinea, or Portugal and any other country that Spain may sign a bilateral agreement with.

Foreign nationals who acquire Spanish nationality must renounce their previous nationality, unless they are natural-born citizens of a Latin American country, Andorra, the Philippines, Equatorial Guinea, or Portugal.

Since October 2002, dual citizens of Spain and another country who are born outside Spain to a Spanish citizen parent born outside Spain must declare to conserve their Spanish nationality between ages 18 and 21.

Citizenship of the European Union
Because Spain forms part of the European Union, Spanish citizens are also citizens of the European Union under European Union law and thus enjoy rights of free movement and have the right to vote in elections for the European Parliament. When in a non-EU country where there is no Spanish embassy, Spanish citizens have the right to get consular protection from the embassy of any other EU country present in that country. Spanish citizens can live and work in any country within the EU as a result of the right of free movement and residence granted in Article 21 of the EU Treaty.

Travel freedom of Spanish citizens

According to the 2020 Visa Restrictions Index, holders of a Spanish passport can visit 190 countries visa-free or with visa on arrival. In the index, Spain is in the 4th rank in terms of travel freedom.

The Spanish nationality is ranked eleventh in Nationality Index (QNI). This index differs from the Visa Restrictions Index, which focuses on external factors including travel freedom. The QNI considers, in addition, to travel freedom on internal factors such as peace & stability, economic strength, and human development as well.

References

External links
Government of Spain. Ministerio de Empleo y Seguridad

Nationality
Spain and the European Union
Nationality law